General elections were held in Venezuela on 1 December 1968. The presidential election was won by Rafael Caldera of Copei, who received 29.1% of the vote. Acción Democrática (Democratic Action, AD) remained the largest party in the Chamber of Deputies and Senate. Voter turnout was 96.7% in the presidential election and 94.5% in the Congressional elections.  When Caldera took office in March 1969, it marked the first time in Venezuela's history as an independent nation that the sitting government peacefully transferred power to an elected member of the opposition.

Background
The election was shaped by a split in AD. Luis Beltrán Prieto Figueroa, then President of the Venezuelan Senate and President of AD, won the AD primary election (held in 1967). His nomination was overturned in favor of Gonzalo Barrios by the Rómulo Betancourt faction of AD, which considered Prieto Figueroa too left-wing. Prieto Figueroa and a substantial number of his supporters then split from AD and formed a new party: the People's Electoral Movement ("Movimiento Electoral del Pueblo" - MEP). Ultimately, Prieto finished fourth, but his 719,000 votes far exceeded the 32,900-vote gap between Caldera and Barrios.

Results

President

Congress

References

1968 in Venezuela
Venezuela
Elections in Venezuela
Presidential elections in Venezuela
December 1968 events in South America
Election and referendum articles with incomplete results